Ambira is a settlement in Kenya's Siaya County.

Infrastructure 
The Ambira sub-country hospital is located in the village of Ambira, which served as a government vaccination site for the COVID-19 vaccine. Ambira also has one primary and one secondary school.

References 

Populated places in Nyanza Province
Siaya County